Melodifestivalen 2007 was the selection for the 47th song to represent Sweden at the Eurovision Song Contest. It was the 46th time that this system of picking a song has been used. Five heats took place to select the ten songs for the final, in Jönköping, Gothenburg, Örnsköldsvik, Gävle and a Second Chance round in Nyköping. The final was broadcast on SVT1, SVT Europa, YLE FST5 and Sveriges Radio's P4 network. The pre-contest favourites were The Ark, with The Worrying Kind and they won, scoring the highest marks with both juries and televoters. The Ark also received the highest number of televotes a song had ever achieved in Melodifestivalen at the time, beating Carola's record from Melodifestivalen 2006. The record was later broken by Loreen at Melodifestivalen 2012.

Heats
The heats for Melodifestivalen 2007 began on 3 February 2007. There were five heats in Jönköping, Gothenburg, Örnsköldsvik, Gävle and Nyköping (second chance round) leading up to the final at the Globen on 10 March 2007.

Preselection

The deadline for the submission of songs was 19 September 2006, and 3,234 songs were submitted , falling short of the 2006 record. The titles and composers of the 28 heatists (the exceptions being the wildcards) were announced on October 10, 2006. "More Than A Girl", composed by Ulf Lindström, Agnes Carlsson and Johan Ekhé was disqualified on October 13, 2006, as Carlsson had publicly stated that she had composed the song, which could have affected the impartiality of the jury . "Alla kan bli stjärnor" was disqualified on October 16, 2006, as one of the composers, Sebastian Fronda, refused to sing the song in the competition . The two disqualified songs were replaced by "Allt vi en gång trodde på" and "Cara mia". On 1 November 2006, Kristian Luuk was confirmed as host for all six rounds of the competition. The performers of the first 28 selected songs were announced on 28 November 2006. The wildcards were announced on 26 December 2006 – they were Uno & Irma, The Ark, Sebastian Karlsson and Magnus Uggla.

Changes to Second Chance round

On 15 August 2006 SVT announced that the Second Chance round, which had traditionally taken place on the Sunday after the last heat, would be turned into a full Saturday night show . This means that Melodifestivalen 2007 will be a six-week competition, rather than the five-week event it has been in recent years.

As well as turning the Second Chance round into a main show in an arena, the voting for it has also been changed. A knock-out system will be introduced whereby each of the eight artists are split into four groups of two, and the voters can vote for their favourite in each pair. The four winners go through to a second round, where they will be paired off again, with the winners of each pairing going through to the final.

Heat 1 – Jönköping
The first heat of Melodifestivalen 2007 took place in Kinnarps Arena in Jönköping on 3 February 2007.

Heat 2 – Gothenburg
The second heat of Melodifestivalen 2007 took place in Scandinavium in Gothenburg on 10 February 2007.

Heat 3 – Örnsköldsvik
The third heat of Melodifestivalen 2007 took place in Swedbank Arena in Örnsköldsvik on 17 February 2007.

Heat 4 – Gävle
The fourth heat of Melodifestivalen 2007 took place in Läkerol Arena in Gävle on 24 February 2007.

Second Chance – Nyköping
The second chance round of Melodifestivalen 2007 took place in Rosvalla Eventcenter in Nyköping on 3 March 2007.

Duels

Final – Stockholm
The final of Melodifestivalen 2007 took place in Globen in Stockholm on 10 March 2007.

Results

See also
Eurovision Song Contest 2007

ESC history
Sweden in the Eurovision Song Contest 2007
Sweden in the Eurovision Song Contest

Melodifestivalen
Melodifestivalen

Sister contests
 - Melodi Grand Prix 2007
 - Dansk Melodi Grand Prix 2007
 - Euroviisut 2007
 - Söngvakeppni Sjónvarpsins 2007

References

External links

 Melodifestivalen official site
 Gylleneskor.se: Melodifestivalen 2007
 ESCSweden.com
 esc.info.se
 Eurovision Song Contest National Finals

2007 Swedish television seasons
2007
2007 in Swedish music
2007 song contests
February 2007 events in Europe
March 2007 events in Europe
2000s in Stockholm
2000s in Gothenburg
Events in Stockholm
Events in Gävle
Events in Jönköping
Events in Örnsköldsvik
Events in Nyköping